The 22905 / 22906 Okha–Shalimar Superfast Express is a superfast train in the Western Railway zone running between Okha and Shalimar in India. It is currently operated with 22905/22906 train numbers on weekly basis.

Coach Composition

Each train on the Express has standard ICF rakes and a maximum speed of 110 kmph, and consist of 23 coaches:

 1 AC First Class
 2 AC II Tier
 5 AC III Tier
 9 Sleeper Coaches
 1 Pantry Car
 3 General Unreserved
 2 Seating cum Luggage Rake

Service

The 22905/Okha–Shalimar Express has average speeds of 58 km/hr and covers 2582 km in 42 hrs 40 mins.

The 22906/Shalimar–Okha Express has average speeds of 51 km/hr and covers 2582 km in 43 hrs 25 mins.

Route & Halts 

The important stops are:

Schedule

Traction

From Ahmedabad Junction both trains are hauled by a Vadodara Loco Shed-based WAP-4E electric locomotive up until Shalimar and vice versa.

Rake sharing 

The train was used to share its rake with 12905/12906 Howrah–Porbandar Express. Now, it is running independently.

See also 
 Okha railway station
 Shalimar railway station
 Howrah–Porbandar Express

References

External links 
 22905/Okha – Shalimar Express
 22906/Shalimar – Okha Express

Transport in Okha
Rail transport in Howrah
Express trains in India
Rail transport in West Bengal
Rail transport in Jharkhand
Rail transport in Chhattisgarh
Rail transport in Odisha
Rail transport in Maharashtra
Rail transport in Gujarat
Railway services introduced in 2009